Governor Manrique may refer to:

José Manrique (fl. 1800s–1810s), Governor of New Mexico from 1808 to 1814
Mateo González Manrique (fl. 1810s), Governor of West Florida from 1813 to 1815

See also
Hernando de Manrique de Rojas (fl. 1570s), Spanish colonial governor of the Colony of Santiago (Jamaica) around 1575